Frances Hannon is a make-up artist. She won Academy Award for Best Makeup and Hairstyling for the 2014 film The Grand Budapest Hotel at the 87th Academy Awards. Her win was shared with Mark Coulier.

References

External links 
 

Living people
Best Makeup Academy Award winners
Best Makeup BAFTA Award winners
Make-up artists
Place of birth missing (living people)
Year of birth missing (living people)